Pieter Jacobs (born 6 June 1986 in Brasschaat) is a Belgian former professional road bicycle racer, who competed professionally between 2007 and 2016 for the , ,  and  teams.

Major results

2002
 1st National Under-17 Road Race Championships
2004
 1st, Classique des Alpes – U19 version
2007
 5th, Tour of Ireland
2008
 4th, GP Kanton Aargau - Gippingen
 3rd, Presidential Cycling Tour of Turkey
 3rd, Hel van het Mergelland
2011
 2nd, Halle–Ingooigem
2013
 1st, Omloop van het Waasland
 1st, Schaal Sels-Merksem
 2nd, Rund um Köln
 7th, Cholet-Pays de Loire
 9th, Classic Loire Atlantique
2014
 4th, Eschborn-Frankfurt City Loop
 7th Overall, Four Days of Dunkirk

References

External links 

1986 births
Living people
Belgian male cyclists
People from Brasschaat
Cyclists from Antwerp Province
21st-century Belgian people